The Einstein Academy is a small, private school for talented and gifted students in Pre-kindergarten through High school. The academy is registered as a 501(c)(3) Nonprofit organization in Elgin, Illinois, and is accredited by the North Central Association of Colleges and Schools.

The school has affiliations with the Illinois Association for Gifted Children, College Board, and the National Honor Society.

References

Elgin, Illinois
Schools in Kane County, Illinois
Gifted education
Private elementary schools in Illinois
Private middle schools in Illinois
Private high schools in Illinois
2002 establishments in Illinois
Educational institutions established in 2002